Marion Collier Ross (January 24, 1927 – February 8, 2003) was a lieutenant general in the United States Army. He is a former commander of the I Corps at Fort Lewis, a post which he served from 1978 to 1979. He was also Deputy Commanding General of the United States Army Forces Command, and Commander, Third United States Army, retiring in 1983. He married Ann Eleanor Sylvester at Fort Benning in 1950. Ross died in 2003 and is interred at Fort Benning.

References

1927 births
2003 deaths
United States Army personnel of the Vietnam War
People from Moberly, Missouri
Recipients of the Defense Distinguished Service Medal
Recipients of the Distinguished Flying Cross (United States)
Recipients of the Distinguished Service Medal (US Army)
Recipients of the Legion of Merit
Recipients of the Silver Star
United States Army generals